Arthur Andrews (12 January 1903 – 1971) was an English footballer who played for Sunderland as a defender.

Having started out at Durham City, he made his debut for Sunderland on 9 December 1922 against Everton in a 1–1 draw at Goodison Park. Andrews played for Sunderland from 1922 to 1931 and made a total of 227 league appearances scoring two goals.
 
He subsequently played for Blyth Spartans.

References

External links
Arthur Andrews's careers stats at The Stat Cat

1903 births
Footballers from Sunderland
1971 deaths
English footballers
Durham City A.F.C. players
Sunderland A.F.C. players
Blyth Spartans A.F.C. players
Association football defenders